Castleford Academy is a secondary school in Castleford, West Yorkshire, England for children aged 11–18 located on Ferrybridge Road, just east of the town centre and next to Queen's Park.

History
Castleford Secondary School was established in 1906 to meet the need for secondary education in the town, which then had a population of 17,000. The secondary school provided education to children of both sexes and employed both male and female teachers, which was not common for that time. The main school buildings were opened in 1909. 

By the time of the school's Golden Jubilee in 1956 it was called Castleford Grammar School. In 1970 the Grammar School joined with a secondary modern school to become a comprehensive school called Castleford High School. School uniform was abolished at the same time. From 1989, a partnership was developed with Hickson & Welch, a local chemical company and school uniform was re-introduced and the school became a Technology College. In 1995 a new drama theatre was built.

In September 2007 the school was officially renamed Castleford High School Technology and Sports College due to the success of the rugby, football and netball teams gaining it a Sports College classification.

The school's boys and girls rugby league teams have been a dominant force in the Champion Schools competition; in 2009 the school fielded 6 teams in the national finals for the third year in succession.

On 1 April 2011, the school was renamed Castleford Academy and was registered as a charity under the Academies Act 2010, a move that allowed the school to set its own curriculum.

Academic performance
The school gets reasonable results at GCSE for West Yorkshire, well above the England average. There is the sixth form college on site, also NEW College is located nearby, and Castleford Academy now offer a Sports A level. In the sixth form college they offer 3 BTEC Extended Diplomas (at Level 3) in Performance and Excellence (sport), Health and Social Care, and Public Services (uniformed).

Arson
The school has suffered from one incident of arson, with a fire on 4 January 2007 started by three teenagers. It was put out by ten fire engines. It completely gutted the sports hall.

Head Teachers
Castleford Secondary School and Castleford Grammar School
 Thomas Richard Dawes (1906-1930)
 J.L. Hampson (1930-1955)
 E. Riley (1955-1973)

Castleford High School
 Peter Hughes (1973-1981)
 Malcolm Butler (1981-1988)
 David Earnshaw (1989-1995)
 Michael Porter (1995-2005)
 Roy Vaughan (2005-2012)

Castleford Academy
 Steven White (2012-2013)
 George Panayiotou (2013-2021)
 Wesley Bush (2012-date)

Alumni

Nigel Beard (1936-2017), Labour MP for Bexleyheath and Crayford from 1997–2005
Tim Bresnan (born 1985), English and Yorkshire Cricket player from 1995–2001
J.L. Carr (1912-1994), school teacher, novelist and publisher
Henry Moore (1898-1986) OM CH, sculptor
Alan Rhodes (born 1947), rugby league footballer who played in the 1960s, 1970s and 1980s, and coached in the 1980s
David Treasure (born 1950), rugby player
Denzil Webster (1933-2010), cricketer, rugby union and professional rugby league footballer

References

External links
 Official Website
 EduBase

News items
 Arson in January 2007 (with BBC film clip)

Video clips
 Fire in 2007

Academies in the City of Wakefield
Educational institutions established in 1906
Castleford
Secondary schools in the City of Wakefield
1906 establishments in England
School buildings in the United Kingdom destroyed by arson
People educated at Castleford Academy